This is a list of supermarket chains in Spain.

Hypermarkets
Alcampo (Auchan)
Carrefour
Eroski
Hipercor

Supermarkets 
Ahorramás
Aldi
Alimerka
Alcampo
Barcelona Market
BonÀrea
Bon Preu Group
Caprabo
Captura
Carrefour City  
Carrefour
Claudio
Consum
Coviran 
Dia
DinoSol 
E.Leclerc
Familia
Froiz
Gadis
Jodofi
Iceland
IFA
Lidl
Makro
masymas
Mercadona
Pepe La Sal
Repsol
Sánchez Romero
Simply Market
Spar
Supercor
SuperSol
Sabeco
Tu Alteza
Único

Cash and Carry
gm cash 
Makeover

References

Spain
 
Spanish brands
Supermarket